The men's team time trial event was part of the road cycling programme at the 1988 Summer Olympics. The time for the team was stopped after the third person on the team crossed the finish line. The venue for this event was the Tongil-ro Course, Paju, South Korea.

Final standing

References

Road cycling at the 1988 Summer Olympics
Cycling at the Summer Olympics – Men's team time trial
Men's events at the 1988 Summer Olympics